Prodelphinidin C2 is a prodelphinidin trimer found in malt.

References

External links 
 Prodelphinidin C2 at www.phenol-explorer.eu

Condensed tannins
Natural phenol trimers